Bikwin language may refer to:
Leelau language, one of the languages of the Bikwin people
Moo language, an Adamawa language of Nigeria
Mak language (Adamawa), an Adamawa language of Nigeria